Charlie Daniels (1936–2020) was an American singer, songwriter and musician.

Charlie Daniels may also refer to:
Charlie Daniels (album), an album by Charlie Daniels
Charlie Daniels (baseball) (1861–1938), baseball player for the 1884 Boston Reds
Charlie Daniels (politician) (born 1939), U.S. politician
Charlie Daniels (footballer) (born 1986), English professional footballer for Portsmouth

See also
Charles Daniel (disambiguation)
Charles Daniels (disambiguation)

Daniels, Charlie